Jean Hortense Norris (born January 25, 1877 – died September 7, 1955) was an American judge, the first woman magistrate in New York City. She was appointed to the bench in 1919, but disbarred in 1931, for judicial malfeasance.

Early life
Jean Hortense Noonan was from Brooklyn, New York, the daughter of John Giles Noonan and Maria Theresa Ford Noonan. Her father was a Union veteran of the American Civil War. She attended the Dominican Convent High School and Brooklyn Girls' High School. She earned law degrees from New York University in 1909 (LL.B.) and 1911 (LL.M.).

Career
Norris was part of the Tammany Hall political organization, working alongside judge George Washington Olvany. She was active in the suffrage movement in the 1910s. She represented married women teachers who appealed their school boards' denial of maternity leave or continued employment. She also wrote about the laws concerning working conditions for women. She served as president of the National Women Lawyers' Association in 1914.

Norris became the first woman judge in New York in 1919. Her first appointment to the bench was to fill a temporary opening, and then in 1920 moving into permanent positions on the Court of Domestic Relations and the Women's Day Court.  She was elected president of the New York State Federation of Business and Professional Women's Clubs. In 1923 she went on a world tour, to learn about how women offenders were handled in different court systems.

The Hofstadter Committee found that Norris was working in collaboration with the police, falsifying court records and profiting from the sale of bail bonds. She also endorsed Fleischmann's Yeast as a health supplement, wearing her judge's robes in advertisements, a violation of professional ethics. Five judges of the Appellate Division of the New York State Supreme Court ruled that she was guilty on five counts of judicial malfeasance. She was removed from the bench and disbarred in 1931. She unsuccessfully appealed her disbarment later that year.

Norris was known to be harsh in prostitution cases and cases involving black women. In over five thousand cases, "and especially in prostitution-related arrests of black women, Norris handed down 40 percent more convictions than other magistrates." This is exemplified by her decision to imprison dancer Mabel Hampton in Bedford Hills in 1924, who did not engage in prostitution and has described being framed in a setup by a police informant.

In 1933, the former magistrate sued the producers of a play titled Four O'Clock, because it included a corrupt woman judge that she believed was a damaging reference to her own legal troubles. The producers agreed to change the character's gender to settle the suit. In 1936 her essay "The Marriage Problem" appeared in American newspapers, predicting a constitutional amendment to make marriage and divorce laws more uniform across the United States.

Personal life
Jean Noonan married Thomas H. Norris in 1897, and was widowed when he died from a self-inflicted gunshot wound, apparently by accident, in 1899.

Death
Jean Hortense Norris died at the age of 78 on September 7, 1955, having lived the last 20 years of her life in relative obscurity. She was buried in Holy Cross Cemetery, Brooklyn alongside her father John G. Noonan (d.1894).

See also
List of first women lawyers and judges in New York

References

External links
 A photograph of Jean H. Norris from the 1910s, from the Bain News Service collection, Library of Congress.

1877 births
20th-century deaths
New York University alumni
People from Brooklyn
20th-century American judges
20th-century American lawyers
Lawyers from New York City
Girls' High School alumni
20th-century American women lawyers
20th-century American women judges